Pojoaque (Tewa: Pʼohsųwæ̨geh Ówîngeh/P'osuwaege Owingeh [p’òhsũ̀wæ̃̀gè ʔówîŋgè]), Po’su wae geh, which translates to “water gathering place”, is a census-designated place (CDP) in Santa Fe County, New Mexico, United States. It is part of the Santa Fe, New Mexico Metropolitan Statistical Area. The population was 1,907 at the 2010 census. Pojoaque Pueblo, a neighboring community, is an Indian reservation, and the town of Pojoaque is a collection of communities near the pueblo with people from various ethnic backgrounds. The area of Pojoaque includes the neighborhoods of Cuyamungue, Jacona, Jaconita, Nambé and El Rancho.

History

Pojoaque
In the early 17th century, the first Spanish mission, San Francisco de Pojoaque was founded. During the Pueblo Revolt of 1680, Pojoaque was abandoned, and was not resettled until circa 1706. By 1712, the population had reached 79. During the revolt of 1837, New Mexico native Manuel Armijo defeated the rebels at Puertocito Pojoaque, east of Santa Cruz de la Cañada. In the early 1900s, the Pojoaque Valley School District was established to serve the educational needs of the valley.

Pojoaque Pueblo

Pojoaque Pueblo is one of the six Tewa-speaking Rio Grande Pueblos, and a member of the Eight Northern Pueblos. The Pueblo was settled around 500 AD, with the population peaking in the 15th and 16th centuries.

In about 1900, a severe smallpox epidemic caused the pueblo to be abandoned once again by 1912. In 1934, Pojoaque Pueblo was reoccupied, and became a federally recognized Indian reservation in 1936.

Pojoaque Pueblo remains a major employer in the region, owning several business enterprises, including the gaming operations of three casino locations: Buffalo Thunder Resort, Cities of Gold Casino, and Jake's Casino. Prior to 2017, the New Mexico state gaming compacts signed by the pueblo expired, but the pueblo has continued gaming operations and resumed negotiations with the state of New Mexico.

Geography

Pojoaque is located at  (35.890581, -106.009511).

According to the United States Census Bureau, the CDP has a total area of 2.9 square miles (7.5 km), all land.

Pojoaque Creek runs from the Sangre de Cristo Mountains from Nambé Lake westward.  Passing through the pueblo, it joins the Rio Tesuque to form the Pojoaque River, which flows into the Rio Grande.

Demographics

As of the census of 2000, there were 1,261 people, 493 households, and 332 families residing in the CDP. The population density was 437.3 people per square mile (169.1/km). There were 533 housing units at an average density of 184.8 per square mile (71.5/km). The racial makeup of the CDP was 52.10% White, 0.56% African American, 17.37% Native American, 26.57% from other races, and 3.41% from two or more races. Hispanic or Latino of any race were 62.17% of the population.

There were 493 households, out of which 38.3% had children under the age of 18 living with them, 46.7% were married couples living together, 13.0% had a female householder with no husband present, and 32.5% were non-families. 26.6% of all households were made up of individuals, and 6.9% had someone living alone who was 65 years of age or older. The average household size was 2.56 and the average family size was 3.10.

In the CDP, the population was spread out, with 28.9% under the age of 18, 9.3% from 18 to 24, 30.4% from 25 to 44, 23.3% from 45 to 64, and 8.1% who were 65 years of age or older. The median age was 34 years. For every 100 females, there were 103.1 males. For every 100 females age 18 and over, there were 101.3 males.

The median income for a household in the CDP was $15,875, and the median income for a family was $24,719. Males had a median income of $19,830 versus $17,105 for females. The per capita income for the CDP was $13,968. About 17.2% of families and 18.7% of the population were below the poverty line, including 23.4% of those under age 18 and 15.3% of those age 65 or over.

Attractions
Pojoaque Pueblo opened the Poeh Museum in 1987, and the Cities of Gold Casino in the mid-1990s.

In 2008 the Pueblo opened the Buffalo Thunder resort and casino, New Mexico's largest and most expensive resort. The estimated cost for the resort project in 2004 was $250 million.

Education
The Pojoaque Valley is served by the Pojoaque Valley School District, which administers several schools, teaching Kindergarten through twelfth grade:
 Pojoaque Valley High School
 Pojoaque Middle School
 Pojoaque Sixth Grade Academy
 Pojoaque Intermediate School
 Pablo Roybal Elementary School

Pojoaque Valley High School competes in the NMAA District 2AAAA in athletics.

See also

 Poeh Center

References

External links

 Pojoaque community profile
 Pojoaque Pueblo article
 Pojoaque pottery gallery

Census-designated places in Santa Fe County, New Mexico
Census-designated places in New Mexico
Tewa
Northern Rio Grande National Heritage Area